Teymuraz Gabashvili tried to defend his 2008 title but he was eliminated by Xavier Malisse in the second round.
Number 1 seed Janko Tipsarević won this tournament, defeating unseeded Sergiy Stakhovsky in the final, 7–6(4), 6–3.

Seeds

Draw

Final eight

Top half

Bottom half

References
 Main Draw
 Qualifying Draw

Ethias Trophy - Singles
2009 Ethias Trophy